The Chaperone  is a 2011 American crime comedy film directed by Stephen Herek, and also produced by WWE Studios. It stars Triple H, Yeardley Smith, Ariel Winter, Kevin Corrigan, José Zúñiga, Kevin Rankin, Enrico Colantoni, and Israel Broussard.

Plot
Ray Bradstone, a talented getaway driver, is determined to go straight, be a better parent to his daughter Sally, and make amends with his ex-wife, Lynne. As Ray struggles to find honest work, he agrees to take one last job with his old bank-robbing crew, led by Phillip Larue. Ray changes his mind at the last second, choosing to chaperone a field trip with Sally's class and leaving the thieves without a worthy means of escape. The robbery is a disaster and now Ray must deal with an enraged Larue while driving a school bus full of kids.

Cast
 Paul "Triple H" Levesque as Raymond "Ray" Bradstone
 Ariel Winter as Sally Bradstone
 Kevin Corrigan as Phillip "The Cat" Larue
 Jose Zuniga as Officer Carlos Flynt
 Annabeth Gish as Lynne Bradstone
 Yeardley Smith as Miss Miller
 Kevin Rankin as Meyer "Goldy" Stenz
 Enrico Colantoni as Dr. Marvin Etman
 Ashley Taylor as Meredith
 Israel Broussard as Josh
 Darren O'Hare as Augie
 Lucy Webb as Dr. Marjorie
 Jake Walker as Ted
 Cullen Foster Chaffin as Simon
 Taylor Faye Ruffin as Brenda
 Camille Bourgeois as Bill
 Nick Gomez as Nick The Bus Driver
 J. D. Evermore as Theodore Del Muniz
 Alec Rayme as Kevin
 Billy Slaughter as Father

Reception
 
The Chaperone met with negative reviews from critics. Review aggregation website Rotten Tomatoes gives the film a score of 29% based on 17 reviews, with an average rating of 3.7/10. Metacritic gives a score of 33/100 based on reviews from 11 critics.

Eric Kohn of Indiewire graded the film a C−, saying that it had flat direction and a mediocre script and said "As a vehicle for WWE champ Paul "Triple H" Levesque, it's haplessly stuck on cruise control." Nick Schager of Slant Magazine gave it half-a-star out of four, criticizing the script, direction and characters saying that "this hulk-with-a-heart-of-gold fable embraces banalities with a vigor matched only by its lack of imagination."

Awards

References

External links

2011 films
American coming-of-age comedy films
American crime comedy films
American teen comedy films
2010s English-language films
Films about buses
Films directed by Stephen Herek
Films set in New Orleans
WWE Studios films
2010s crime comedy films
2010s teen comedy films
2010s coming-of-age comedy films
2010s American films
English-language crime comedy films